Eileach an Naoimh, also known as Holy Isle, is an uninhabited island in the Inner Hebrides of the west coast of Scotland.  It is the southernmost of the Garvellachs archipelago and lies in the Firth of Lorne between Mull and Argyll. The name is Gaelic for "rocky place of the saint".

About 542, St. Brendan the Navigator founded a monastery on Eilach, presumed to be the island, possibly because of the combination of its isolation and good grazing. Columba is believed to have visited the island and it is one of the proposed locations of the Columban retreat isle of Hinba. Eileach an Naoimh may be the burial site of Columba's mother Eithne.
The monastery was destroyed by – or, at least, may have become excessively vulnerable to – Viking raiders, from about 800. The island has probably seen only intermittent occupation since, which has contributed to the survival of the ruins of many of the monastic buildings, including two chapels, beehive cells, and a graveyard with three crosses and another circular grave. The cells are contained in a pentagonal enclosure overlooking the rocky landing place on the south, which is guarded by various skerries. Beyond the enclosure there is another cell with two rooms. The oldest chapel is rectangular and may date from the 11th or 12th century. The monastic ruins are the oldest ecclesiastical buildings in Scotland and the site is in the care of Historic Environment Scotland. If the ruins date from the time of Brendan this would potentially make them the oldest extant church buildings in Britain, although the earliest written record of their existence dates from the late 9th century.

There is no ferry service, and transport to the island and its neighbours must be arranged privately.

Footnotes

External links

 Canmore

Uninhabited islands of Argyll and Bute
Historic Scotland properties in Argyll and Bute